The 2009 BAFL Season is the British American Football League. BritBowl XXIII, the league's championship game, was scheduled to be played at Keepmoat Stadium in Doncaster on 27 September 2009.

Schedule

Regular season

Formula 
Based on the British American Football League, setup for the 2009 season there will be a 3 tier structure consisting of:

Regular season standings 

W = Wins, L = Losses, T = Ties, PCT = Winning Percentage, PF= Points for, PA = Points against

Clinched playoff seeds are shaded in green.

BAFL Premier standings 
<div style="float:Centre;">

BAFL Division 1 standings

BAFL Division 2 standings

Northern section

Southern section

Playoffs 
The playoffs are scheduled to be played on 5/6 September 2009.  BritBowl XXIII will then be played on 27 September 2009 at Keepmoat Stadium in Doncaster.

BAFL Premier Playoff

BAFL Premier Championship Game/BritBowl

BAFL 1 Playoff

BAFL 1 Championship Game

BAFL 2 Playoff 

The BAFL 2 Playoffs are split geographically between the North and the South. The Southern half of the draw includes the conferences champions from each of the East, South East and South West. The Northern half includes conferences champions from the Scottish, Northern and Central conferences. There is a wild card team from each of the North and the South.

BAFL 2 Championship Game

See also 
BritBowl

British American Football League
BAFL season
BAFL season